Debt-trap diplomacy is an international financial relationship where a creditor country or institution extends debt to a borrowing nation partially, or solely, to increase the lender's political leverage. The creditor country is said to extend excessive credit to a debtor country with the intention of extracting economic or political concessions when the debtor country becomes unable to meet its repayment obligations. The conditions of the loans are often not publicized. The borrowed money commonly pays for contractors and materials sourced from the creditor country.

The term was coined by Indian academic Brahma Chellaney to describe how the Chinese government leverages the debt burden of smaller countries for geopolitical ends. Other analysts have described the idea of a Chinese debt trap as a "myth" or "distraction".

Origin and background 
The term was coined by Brahma Chellaney in 2017 to describe what he called China's predatory lending practices, which overwhelm poor countries with unsustainable loans and force them to cede strategic leverage to China. According to Chellaney, "It's clearly part of China's geostrategic vision." The Chinese government is requiring secret negotiations and non-competitive pricing on projects in which bidding is closed and contracts must go to Chinese state-owned or state-linked companies which charge above-market prices. The idea was advanced by two Harvard University graduate students in a paper which called it Chinese "debt book diplomacy". The paper was cited by The Guardian, The New York Times and other major media outlets as academic evidence of China's intentions and spread through the media, intelligence circles and Western governments within a year.

Its original meaning has expanded to include other parts of the world. In 2018, The Guardian reported that some Belt and Road Initiative countries have begun reconsidering the project, with eight countries at risk of default. According to Jonathan Hillman, director of the Reconnecting Asia Project at the Center for Strategic and International Studies, there is more to these projects than financial strategy; "[i]t's also a vehicle for China to write new rules, establish institutions that reflect Chinese interests, and reshape 'soft' infrastructure." The term was further defined in a 2018 report by the Harvard Kennedy School's Belfer Center for Science and International Affairs, which described debt-trap diplomacy in the context of Chinese geostrategic interests.

Assessments

Media outlets
Western, Indian, and African media outlets have criticized the terms of Chinese state loans and their high interest rates. One example was a 2006 loan to Tonga to rebuild infrastructure. In 2013 and 2014, Tonga experienced a debt crisis when the Exim Bank of China (its creditor) did not write them off; the loans cost 44 percent of Tonga's gross domestic product (GDP). According to some analysts, such practices highlight China's hegemonic intentions and its challenges to state sovereignty.

In March 2022, Bloomberg News reported that despite China making western countries uncomfortable with its large infrastructure projects in Africa, a deeper look into the evidence showed that the accusations towards China on doing debt-trap diplomacy in the continent, was "unfounded". The Economist investigation found that China, although a big lender, accounted for fewer shares of loans compared to the World Bank and commercial loans. No evidence of predatory lending practices was found.

Governments
In August 2018, a bipartisan group of 16 U.S. senators said that China engages in debt-trap diplomacy. In an October 2018 speech, U.S. Secretary of State Mike Pompeo said that China's loans are facilitated with bribes. A number of U.S. government documents refer to debt-trap diplomacy, including the 2020 Department of State report "The Elements of the China Challenge". According to senior U.S. government officials, Beijing "encourages dependency using opaque contracts [...] that mire nations in debt and undercut their sovereignty".

In 2021, the Trinidad and Tobago government defended its decision to accept a multi-million dollar loan from China rather than from the IMF by saying that (unlike the IMF) Beijing was not demanding any "stringent conditions" for its loans. Minister of Finance Colm Imbert said at a news conference,

Studies
A May 2018 paper by Sam Parker and Gabrielle Chefitz from the Belfer Center for Science and International Affairs posited three strategic goals behind China's lending: "filling out a 'String of Pearls' to solve its 'Malacca Dilemma' and project power across vital South Asian trading routes; undermining and fracturing the US-led regional coalition contesting Beijing's South China Sea claims; and enabling the People's Liberation Army Navy to push through the 'Second Island Chain' into the blue-water Pacific."

A March 2018 report released by the Center for Global Development said that between 2001 and 2017, China restructured or waived loan payments for 51 debtor nations (most of the BRI's participants) without seizing state assets. In September 2018, W. Gyude Moore, a former Liberian public works minister and senior policy fellow at the Center for Global Development, said, "The language of 'debt-trap diplomacy' resonates more in Western countries, especially the United States, and is rooted in anxiety about China's rise as a global power rather than in the reality of Africa." Moore stated in 2021 that "China has been a net positive partner with most African countries." 

An August 2018 China Africa Research Initiative report authored by Deborah Bräutigam, Janet Eom, and Lina Benabdallah said, "Chinese loans are not currently a major contributor to debt distress in Africa." According to the report, China was at the time "the most significant contributor to high risk of/actual debt distress" to three African countries: Zambia, Djibouti, and Congo.

In April 2019, the Rhodium Group said that China's leverage in debt was limited in power. According to a May 2019 Sydney Morning Herald article, accusations of "debt trap diplomacy" were being questioned by new research; an analysis of 40 Chinese debt re-negotiations by the Rhodium Group found "asset seizures are a very rare occurrence", and debt write-off is the most common outcome. The article also reported the views of Australian National University senior lecturer Darren Lim, who (referring to the Rhodium Group study) said that much of the leverage shifts to the borrower rather than the lender after the loan has been made. Lim also said that although the debt-trap diplomacy theory was never credible, the Trump administration embraced it. La Trobe University head of humanities and social sciences Nick Bisley said that China aimed to build political capital through the BRI, but asset seizures would not achieve that end.

An October 2019 report by the Lowy Institute said that China had not engaged in deliberate actions in the Pacific which justified accusations of debt-trap diplomacy (based on contemporaneous evidence), and China had not been the primary driver behind rising debt risks in the Pacific; the report expressed concern about the scale of the country's lending, however, and the institutional weakness of Pacific states which posed the risk of small states being overwhelmed by debt. A 2020 Lowy Institute article called Sri Lanka's Hambantota International Port the "case par excellence" for China's debt-trap diplomacy, but called the narrative a "myth" because the project was proposed by former Sri Lankan president Mahinda Rajapaksa, not Beijing. The article added that Sri Lanka's debt distress was not caused by Chinese lending, but by "excessive borrowing on Western-dominated capital markets".

Deborah Bräutigam, a professor at Johns Hopkins University, described debt-trap diplomacy as a "meme" which became popular due to "human negativity bias" based on anxiety about the rise of China. According to a 2019 research paper by Bräutigam, most of the debtor countries voluntarily agreed to the loans and had positive experiences working with China and "the evidence so far, including the Sri Lankan case, shows that the drumbeat of alarm about Chinese banks' funding of infrastructure across the BRI and beyond is overblown ... a large number of people have favorable opinions of China as an economic model and consider China an attractive partner for their development." Bräutigam and Meg Rithmire said that the theory lacked evidence, and criticized the media for promoting a narrative that "wrongfully misrepresents the relationship between China and the developing countries that it deals with." According to their research, China had never actually seized an asset from any country.

Gelpern et al. (2021) analyzed 100 contracts across 24 countries and found that "Chinese contracts contain unusual confidentiality clauses that bar borrowers from revealing the terms or even the existence of the debt", "Chinese lenders seek advantage over other creditors", and "cancellation. . . clauses in Chinese contracts potentially allow the lenders to influence debtors’ domestic and foreign policies."

In June 2022, according to a report by researchers from Columbia University and the University of Oxford, "the debt-trap narrative is a function of China-US strategic and ideological rivalry rather than a reflection of African realities or perspectives." While China is Africa's biggest bilateral creditor, most of the African debt is held by private Western holders, specifically American and European investors. Chinese debt is not the most rapidly growing segment of debt, whereas African debt owned by investors from America and Europe is the fastest growing segment of African debt in the last few years. At the end of 2019, Africa's total debt was equal to US$964 billion and the total debt owed to Chinese entities was equal to US$78 billion, which is equal to about 8 per cent of the region's total debt. In response to US criticism, Chinese institutions made many goodwill gestures by postponing debt repayments worth roughly $750 million. The study said, “contrary to the debt-trap narrative, if a wave of African defaults materializes in the near future, as International Financial Institutions officials have been fearing since at least 2015, it will be catalyzed more by private-sector maneuvering and intransigence than by Chinese scheming."

The IMF and the World Bank
Both the International Monetary Fund (IMF) and World Bank have been accused of predatory lending practices to keep emerging economies in debt, including: demanding structural adjustment programmes as a condition for loans, often to governments who see these loans as a last resort, pressuring for privatization and exerting undue influence over central banks. The founder of the activist network Committee for the Abolition of Illegitimate Debt wrote: "The World Bank and the IMF have systematically made loans to states as a means of influencing their policies." The IMF has used geopolitical considerations, rather than exclusively economic conditions, to decide which countries received loans.

In the book Confessions of an Economic Hit Man, whistle blower John Perkins accused international lenders, including the World Bank and the IMF of persuading leaders of underdeveloped countries to accept loans for large development projects. Working as a consultant, Perkins was involved in misrepresenting the profitability of the development projects so that they appeared to be to be self-financing.

In 2020, Oxfam reported that the IMF was "using its power" through COVID-19 pandemic relief loans to impose austerity on poor countries. IMF conditions have forced recipients to cut healthcare spending, hampering their response to the COVID-19 pandemic.

Africa

Background
African countries rapidly increased their borrowing from China between 2000 and 2014 (totaling US$94.5 billion) as they sought to end their dependence on the IMF and World Bank, which demand market liberalisation in exchange for loans. Johanna Malm wrote that Chinese loans have been an alternative to IMF loans. IMF loans are lower-cost and financed by limited government income; Chinese loans are more expensive, but secured by high-revenue projects. China is a major project stakeholder in the economies of many African countries, significantly influencing the continent's affairs. According to 2015 and 2017 World Bank records, several African countries owe large debts to China and other creditor nations. Private-sector interest rates of about 55 percent prompted some African countries to go to China, which charges about 17 percent, for loans. Debts from African countries to China paid for the investment in sectors needing critical development.

According to research conducted as part of the Jubilee Debt Campaign in October 2018, African debt to China rose from $10 billion in 2010 to more than $30 billion in 2016. China loaned a total of $143 billion to African governments and state-owned enterprises between 2000 and 2017. In 2020, the African countries with the largest Chinese debt were Angola ($25 billion), Ethiopia ($13.5 billion), Zambia ($7.4 billion), the Republic of the Congo ($7.3 billion), and Sudan ($6.4 billion).

In August 2022, the Ministry of Foreign Affairs of the People's Republic of China announced that it would forgive 23 interest-free loans that matured at the end of 2021 to 17 unspecified African countries.

Evidence of debt trap diplomacy

Trade between African countries and China has also affected ties between Africa and other continents, especially Europe and North America. According to Deborah Brautigam, Chinese loans are prone to misuse and have encouraged corruption and power struggles in African countries. She also published her findings in a 2020 article for Johns Hopkins’ China Africa Research Initiative, titled “Debt Relief with Chinese Characteristics". Her analysis investigated Chinese loans in Ethiopia, Angola and the Republic of Congo, and “found no ‘asset seizures’. They also found that Beijing cancelled at least $3.4 billion and had restructured or refinanced around $15 billion of debt in Africa between the dates of 2000 and 2019. And at least 26 individual loans to African nations had been renegotiated. Writing in The Atlantic, Bräutigam stated that the debt-trap narrative is “a lie, and a powerful one" and that her research shown that "Chinese banks are willing to restructure the terms of existing loans and have never actually seized an asset from any country".

Despite criticism that Chinese firms emphasize Chinese labor, Chinese-funded infrastructure projects in Africa primarily employ African workers. A 2017 McKinsey report on Sino-African economic relations found that Africans made up 89 percent of labor on the projects surveyed, and job training and local workers were regularly included in contract negotiations between the Exim Bank of China and African countries.

Britain's Debt Justice charity, formerly the Jubilee Debt Campaign, found in a 2022 study, based on World Bank figures, that more African governments' external debts were being owed to Western banks, asset managers and oil traders (35%) than to Chinese lenders (12%). It also found that interest rates charged on western private loans (5%) were almost double that of Chinese loans (2.7%) and that "the most indebted countries were less likely to have their debt dominated by China".

Of 24 African countries that spent more than 15% of government revenue servicing debt in 2021, six countries - Angola, Cameroon, Republic of Congo, Djibouti, Ethiopia and Zambia - sent over a third of debt payments to Chinese lenders. Other private creditors accounted for over a third of payments in 12 countries.

Kenya 

Between 2006 and 2017, Kenya borrowed at least KSh. 1043.77 billion ($9.8 billion) from China. Chinese debt accounts for 21 percent of Kenya's foreign debt, and 72 percent of the country's bilateral debt. China lent Kenya funds to build highways and a railway between Mombasa and Nairobi totaling over US$6.5 billion by 2020. Kenya reportedly came close to default on Chinese loans to develop its largest and most lucrative port, the Port of Mombasa, in late December 2018; there was speculation that a default could have forced Kenya to relinquish control of the port to China. However, reports have cast doubt on Chinese debt-trap threat to the port. Kenyan media have debated whether Chinese loans are worth the risk, drawing analogies with the experience of Sri Lanka and saying that these loans could jeopardize Kenyan sovereignty.

South Africa 

South Africa owes an estimated four percent of its annual gross domestic product to China. The country received multiple tranches of Chinese loans, some of which have raised concerns about opaque conditions and links to corruption. This includes a controversial $2.5 billion loan from the China Development Bank to the state-owned South African electrical utility Eskom which was arranged under the Jacob Zuma government. Another $2.5 billion loan to Eskom from Huarong Energy (a private Chinese company) was found improper by the Zondo Commission of Inquiry into state corruption, prompting Eskom chairperson Jabu Mabuza to say that the company would not repay the loan due to irregularities and corruption involved in the loan process.

An additional R 370 billion ($25.8 billion) loan from the China Development Bank during the presidency of Cyril Ramaphosa was made to promote a 2018 economic stimulus package. The South African government initially described the loan as a "gift"; details of the loan were not made public, generating controversy. The government justified the loan, saying that the interest rate was not exorbitant but could not be disclosed due to a confidentiality clause. The loan was criticized by the opposition Democratic Alliance for risking the country's fall into a "debt trap".

Uganda 

In October 2021, an investigation by the Parliament of Uganda concluded that non-public loan terms by Exim Bank of China for a $200 million expansion of Entebbe International Airport were onerous and could potentially lead to the loss of the airport in case of default. In November 2021, the Chinese embassy in Uganda rejected statements that the airport might be confiscated. A 2022 study of the loan contract by AidData stated that the airport was not at risk of seizure.

Zambia
Based on 2018 statistics in The Economist, China probably holds one-fourth to one-third of Zambia's external debt (comparable to other creditors, such as the U.S. and the World Bank. That year, Zambian lawmakers debated whether Chinese loans put Zambian sovereignty at risk. According to Africa Confidential, ZESCO (Zambia's state-owned power company) was in talks about repossession by a Chinese company. The Zambian government denied ZESCO privatization allegations. In July 2022, a committee of creditors co-chaired by China and France stated that they were committed to negotiating a restructuring of debt with Zambia under a G20 framework.

Elsewhere in Africa 
Nigeria: China owns $3.1 billion of the country's total $27.6 billion foreign debt. The Nigerian financial publication Nairametrics warned about falling into a Chinese debt trap because of Nigeria's problems with corruption. 
Djibouti: The country has borrowed to develop a strategic port, and Chinese loans total 77 percent of Djibouti's total debt. The country owes over 80 percent of its GDP to China, and became host to China's first overseas military base in 2017.
Republic of the Congo: An estimated $2.5 billion is owed to Chinese lenders; the exact figure is unknown, even by the Congolese government.
Egypt: China is financing the country's New Administrative Capital project. Gen. Ahmed Abdeen, who heads the Egyptian state-owned enterprise overseeing the new capital, criticized American reluctance to invest in Egypt during an interview: "Stop talking to us about human rights. Come and do business with us. The Chinese are coming—they are seeking win-win situations. Welcome to the Chinese."

Asia

Sri Lanka 

In contrast to various conditions imposed by the World Bank or IMF, China has attached few conditions to its loans to Sri Lanka, requiring no policy reforms or similar structural adjustments. The use of Chinese labor on the project funded by the loan is the only condition for most Chinese loans to Sri Lanka.

Critics of Chinese foreign policy argue that loans to Sri Lanka by the Exim Bank of China to build the Hambantota International Port and the Mattala Rajapaksa International Airport are examples of debt-trap diplomacy. Contrary to critic's narratives, a 2022 Johns Hopkins University study found that there were no Chinese debt-to-equity swaps, no asset seizures, and no "hidden debt."

In 2007, the state-owned Chinese firms China Harbour Engineering Company and Sinohydro Corporation were hired to build the port for $361 million. Exim funded 85 percent of the project at an annual interest rate of 6.3 percent. After the project began losing money and Sri Lanka's debt-servicing burden increased, its government decided to lease the project to state-owned China Merchants Port on a 99-year lease for cash. The $1.12 billion lease to the Chinese company was used by Sri Lanka to address balance-of-payment issues. This raised concerns in the United States, Japan and India that the port might be used as a Chinese naval base to contain the country's geopolitical rivals, and the Chinese government might foreclose on the project.

Brahma Chellaney noted that China had gained considerable diplomatic leverage during the presidency of Mahinda Rajapaksa and enlarged its footprint in Sri Lanka. When a new government took power, Sri Lanka was on the "brink of default" and the new government had no choice but "to turn around and embrace China again". Chellaney described the Hambantota port as a strategically important natural asset with long-term value to China, even if it lacked short-term commercial viability. He said that China does not evaluate a borrower's creditworthiness, and will lend even if a loan would place a borrower in debt distress. It was later learned that Sri Lanka's debt burden was $51 billion, and 95 percent of its government revenue was going to debt servicing.

A statement issued by 182 leading economists accused private creditors - mostly Western banks & hedge funds - who hold 40% of Sri Lanka's debt of effectively taking the country hostage.

Current Sri Lankan prime minister Mahinda Rajapaksa defended the country's relationship with China and rejected the country's debt trap image, adding that "China provided concessionary loans for many infrastructure projects [during the post-conflict development]." In regards to the Hambantota Port, he added, "The Hambantota Port is not a debt trap." Rajapaksa dismissed the view that Sri Lanka was forced to enter a 99-year lease with a Chinese company because of a failure to pay the project's debts, stating that the project is commercially viable and is transforming Sri Lanka's overall port infrastructure.

Karunasena Kodituwakku, the Sri Lankan ambassador to China, said that the Chinese government did not ask the Sri Lankan government to hand over the port; the Sri Lankan government initially asked China to lease the port. Other Sri Lankan representatives have noted that it made sense for Sri Lanka to welcome Chinese investment in the port because most of its commercial shipping was from that country."

Deborah Bräutigam has disputed the usage of the term "debt-trap diplomacy". Concerning Sri Lanka, Bräutigam has noted that Chinese banks have been willing to restructure the terms of existing loans. She said that the Canadian International Development Agency financed the Canadian engineering and construction firm SNC-Lavalin's feasibility study for the port, and its study concluded in 2003 that construction of a port at Hambantota was feasible. A second feasibility report, concluded in 2006 by the Danish engineering firm Ramboll, reached a similar conclusion. According to Bräutigam, the port in Hambantota had to secure only a fraction of the cargo which went through Singapore to justify its existence. When President Maithripala Sirisena took office in 2015, Sri Lanka owed more to Japan, the World Bank, and the Asian Development Bank than to China; of the $4.5 billion in debt service Sri Lanka paid in 2017, only five percent was for Hambantota. Bräutigam was told by several Sri Lanka Central Bank governors that Hambantota (and Chinese finance in general) were not the major sources of the country's financial distress, and Bräutigam said that Sri Lanka did not default on any loans to China. Colombo had originally arranged a bailout from the IMF, but decided to raise the required funds by leasing the under-performing Hambantota Port to an experienced company as the Canadian feasibility study had recommended. Asanga Abeyagoonasekera, a Sri Lankan academic warned of a Chinese ‘strategic trap’ in Sri Lanka. Strategic-trap diplomacy term was coined by Asanga Abeyagoonasekera and published initially on 16 September 2021, assessing the Chinese Debt-trap diplomacy in Sri Lanka at an interview with Voice of America.

Chatham House published a research paper in 2020 concluding that Sri Lanka's debt distress was unconnected to Chinese lending, but resulted more from "domestic policy decisions" facilitated by Western lending and monetary policy than from Chinese government policies. The paper was skeptical of the claim that China could use Hambantota as a naval base (calling it "clearly erroneous"), and noted that Sri Lankan politicians and diplomats have repeatedly insisted that the topic was never brought up with Beijing; there has been no evidence of Chinese military activity at, or near, Hambantota since the port's lease began.

The lease was delayed for several months by concerns about possible military use and by opposition from trade unions and political parties, who called it a sellout of Sri Lankan national assets to China. Sri Lanka has indicated that it is reconsidering the lease of the Hambantota port to China.

Local newspapers have published cartoons of Sri Lanka pleading for cash from neighboring SAARC countries. Indian observers have noted that the Colombo Port project with China has accelerated the country's debt crisis. According to Chinese state media, it is the largest project by China in Sri Lanka and has a total value of $1.4 billion. The damage to the once-prosperous tourism industry from the COVID-19 pandemic has also been blamed for failing to generate enough revenue to pay the country's debts.

The 2022 Sri Lankan protests led to the resignation of former Sri Lankan Prime Minister Mahinda Rajapaksa. In 2022, Sri Lanka has suffered the worst economic crisis since it became independent in 1948. The country is confronting a severe food, fuel and medicine shortage. The country is also unable to severe its debt obligations to multiple creditors. Global financial institutions, such as the International Monetary Fund (IMF), the Asian Development Bank and World Bank, were seen as also responsible for addressing the crisis based on effective coordination with all creditors. Moreover, it was a result of combined effects that brought about the collapse of the Sri Lankan economy, including the COVID-19 pandemic, surging energy and food prices in the aftermath of the 2022 Ukraine conflict.

Pakistan 

Pakistan has received $42.7 billion in World Bank assistance since 1980, of which $33.4 billion are loans and $9.3 billion are grants; this has allowed the bank to exert local and national decision-making power in the country via public contracts and the appointment of State Bank of Pakistan governors. According to State Bank data, Pakistan's debt to the People's Republic of China was $7.2 billion in 2017; it increased to $19 billion by April 2018 and $30 billion by 2020, primarily due to loans to fund China–Pakistan Economic Corridor (CPEC) projects.  The New York Times reported the investments' emerging military dimension in December 2018, calling it an opaque, poorly-governed debt trap. Experts have estimated that Pakistan would require nearly 40 years to pay back its debt to China. A number of scholars have said that the CPEC "subordinates Pakistan's interests to China's", and the CPEC and Pakistan's growing economic dependence on China could become a threat to Pakistan's sovereignty.

China and Pakistan signed a 2017 agreement to build five hydropower projects, with China investing $50 billion. According to Hassan Abbas, a Pakistani-American scholar in South Asian and Middle Eastern studies, project delays are likely to escalate costs to $98 billion. With accumulated interest of almost $5 billion per year, Pakistan would have to pay almost $200 billion over 20 years to China; scholars suggest that the debt could give China undue influence in Pakistan's affairs. Part of the agreement was scrapped by Pakistan in late 2017 due to objections to its terms.

Malaysia 

China financed $22 billion in Malaysian projects during the administration of Prime Minister Najib Razak. Razak made a 31 May 2014 state visit to China, during which he was welcomed by Chinese premier Li Keqiang.

Malaysia has several Chinese Belt and Road Initiative projects under construction, including the East Coast Rail Line, Kuantan Port Expansion, Green Technology Park in Pahang, Forest City, Robotic Future City, and Samalaju Industrial Park Steel Complex.

In September 2018, Minister of Finance Lim Guan Eng cancelled two contracts, worth approximately $2.795 billion, with China Petroleum Pipeline Bureau for oil and gas pipelines. Mahathir Mohamad and Finance Minister Lim Guan Eng criticized the projects as expensive, unnecessary, superfluous, non-competitive (because open bidding was prohibited), conducted with no public oversight, and favored Chinese state-owned firms and those affiliated with Razak's United Malays National Organisation (UMNO) party at inflated prices. Residents of Malacca City said that the port was unnecessary, and the small company which received the contract had ties to the previously ruling UMNO.

About China's String of Pearls strategy in the Indian Ocean and China's motives in Malaysia and the Strait of Malacca, Malaysian Deputy Minister of Defense Liew Chin Tong said: "You look at a map and you can see the places where China is plotting ports and investments, from Myanmar to Pakistan to Sri Lanka, on toward Djibouti. What's crucial to all that? Our little Malaysia, and the Malacca Strait. I say publicly that we do not want to see warships in the Strait of Malacca or the South China Sea." The loans were later renegotiated; Mahathir Mohamad pledged support for the BRI, and was a key opening speaker at the 2019 BRI Summit in Beijing.

Maldives 

People's Majlis (the Maldives parliament) speaker and former president Mohamed Nasheed said in December 2019 that the Maldives owed China $3.5 billion in loans, which included $1.5 billion in government-to-government loans, private loans, and sovereign guarantees. Nasheed said that the Chinese debt trap was an economic and human-rights issue, and an issue of sovereignty and freedom of the island nation. Nasheed has also said that project costs were inflated, and the debt on paper is far greater than the $1.1 billion actually received.

Laos 

According to the World Bank, by the end of 2021, Laos's public debt had skyrocketed to 88% of gross domestic product, with Chinese creditors accounting for a 47% share of foreign debt. In addition, Laos owes 11% of its debt to China from bilateral loans. The firing of Bank of the Lao P.D.R. Governor Sonexay Sitphaxay in June 2022 hints at the economic crisis and panic.

According to Brahma Chellaney, China has taken effective control of Laos's electricity grid and, by extension, its water resources. Given the small size of Laos's economy with just seven million citizens, he finds China being able to exert enormous power over its resources.

Tajikistan 

By 2008, the People's Republic of China surpassed Tajikistan's other creditors in outstanding loans; by the following year, 77 percent of Tajikistan's total loan portfolio consisted of Chinese loans.

Tajikistan's 2018 debts to foreign creditors ("external debt") was estimated at $2.9 billion, of which $1.2 billion is owed to the Exim (Export-Import) Bank of China. That year, reports indicated that Xinjiang-based TBEA was granted gold-mine concessions in remuneration for TBEA costs to build a 400-megawatt power plant in Dushanbe. At the end of 2020, Tajikistan's total external debt neared $3.1 billion; of this, $1.12 billion (about 37 percent of the total) was owed to the Exim Bank of China.

Europe 

China's BRI has made a number of investments in the European Union and continental Europe, including the port of Piraeus in Greece, Portugal's energy and transport sectors, and Hungarian railways. More than 12,400 freight trains travelled between China and Europe in 2020.

In April 2021, the Prime Minister of Montenegro asked the EU to help the country repay the $1 billion loan granted by the Exim Bank of China in 2014 to fund the A-1 motorway; it accounted for about 25 percent of Montenegro's external debt. Under the terms of the loan, China would receive thousands of hectares in case of non-payment. The project was called unfeasible and not economically viable in two feasibility studies by the European Bank of Reconstruction and Development and the European Investment Bank, the EU's rationale for refusing to fund it. With an estimated cost of $23.8 million per kilometre, it is one of the world's costliest highways. A paper by the China Africa Research Initiative called reporting of the land as collateral a rumor derived from mis-translation of a routine clause in the contract.

Latin America 

An article on CNBC said that Chinese investment in Latin America had been burgeoning and that the project has been heavily criticized amid allegations of debt-trap diplomacy and neocolonialism. These concerns have been pronounced, especially in Venezuela and Ecuador. A 2019 study compiled by Boston University's Global Development Policy Center stated that Chinese lending has not driven Latin American countries, except possibly Venezuela, over IMF debt sustainability thresholds.

Argentina: Argentina has been denied access to, and oversight of, a Chinese satellite tracking station on its territory.
Ecuador: In March 2019, Ecuador agreed to borrow US$4.2 billion from the IMF, at a cost of 6% of its yearly GDP, while still being indebted US$6 billion to the World Bank and Inter-American Development Bank. Ecuador has agreed to sell 80-to-90 percent of its crude oil to China through 2024 in exchange for US$6.5 billion in Chinese loans.
Venezuela: an article published by Carnegie-Tsinghua Center for Global Policy said China's loans in Venezuela are not debt-trap diplomacy nor "creditor imperialism", but simply "lose-lose" financial mistakes in which both parties stand to lose. An article in Quartz summarized the Carnegie article; "counter to the dominant narrative about Chinese debt ensnaring other countries, the country that needs to fear excessive and unsustainable Chinese lending the most is China".

Pacific islands 

In 2019, Lowy institute completed a systematic review of the evidence on whether or not China was doing debt-trap diplomacy in the Pacific Islands. Their findings were that China was not the main driver behind rising debt risks in the Pacific, nor was China the dominant creditor in the region. Only Tonga had China as a dominant creditor, but the researchers argued that this did not confer an advantageous position to China since they had to agree to defer repayments twice yet getting not much in return. They also found that Chinese lending terms were hardly predatory and that they "appear to be much more careful with loans", and concluded that "China has not been engaged in debt-trap diplomacy in the Pacific, as of yet". They also found the "overwhelming majority" of Chinese loans in the region are concessional enough to be deemed more as aid. However they also noted that the majority of the Pacific nations that are currently indebted to China, have little scope to take on more debts and recommended China to restructure their future approach to give more grant assistance, rather than more loans, to avoid overwhelming those nations with too much debts.

Other countries 
China has made loans to Kyrgyzstan, Laos, and Mongolia as part of the BRI. It also made a $115 million loan to Tonga to redevelop its infrastructure, and $2 billion in loans to Papua New Guinea (almost one-fourth of the country's national debt). China also has ongoing projects in Trinidad and Tobago, including a $500 million Chinese-built dry dock and a $102 million industrial park in La Brea.

See also 

 Checkbook diplomacy
 Confessions of an Economic Hit Man
 Debt crisis
 Debt of developing countries
 Dollar diplomacy
 Economic diplomacy
 European debt crisis
 External debt
 Foreign policy of China
 Foreign relations of China
 Go Out policy
 Latin American debt crisis
 National debt of the United States#Concerns over Chinese holdings of U.S. debt
 Predatory lending
 Privatization
 Sovereign default
 Structural adjustment

References 

Foreign relations of China
Chinese economic policy
Debt
Geopolitical terminology
Types of diplomacy
International Monetary Fund